Carrolltown is a borough in Cambria County, Pennsylvania, United States. The population was 853 at the 2010 census, down from 1,049 at the 2000 census. It is part of the Johnstown, Pennsylvania Metropolitan Statistical Area.

Geography
Carrolltown is located in northern Cambria County at  (40.603, -78.709), approximately 20 miles west of Altoona. U.S. Route 219 passes through the borough, leading northwest  to Northern Cambria and south  to Ebensburg, the county seat.

Demographics

As of the census of 2000, there were 1,049 people, 407 households, and 295 families living in the borough. The population density was 1,583.8 people per square mile (613.7/km2). There were 440 housing units at an average density of 664.3 per square mile (257.4/km2). The racial makeup of the borough was 99.62% White, 0.19% African American, and 0.19% from two or more races.

There were 407 households, out of which 29.2% had children under the age of 18 living with them, 59.0% were married couples living together, 10.8% had a female householder with no husband present, and 27.5% were non-families. 25.3% of all households were made up of individuals, and 17.0% had someone living alone who was 65 years of age or older. The average household size was 2.56 and the average family size was 3.06.

In the borough the population was spread out, with 22.2% under the age of 18, 7.2% from 18 to 24, 27.4% from 25 to 44, 23.7% from 45 to 64, and 19.4% who were 65 years of age or older. The median age was 41 years. For every 100 females there were 102.5 males. For every 100 females age 18 and over, there were 98.1 males.

The median income for a household in the borough was $32,833, and the median income for a family was $39,792. Males had a median income of $33,056 versus $17,500 for females. The per capita income for the borough was $16,250. About 6.2% of families and 8.0% of the population were below the poverty line, including 4.7% of those under age 18 and 9.8% of those age 65 or over.

Notable people
Bishop John Carroll, first Catholic bishop and archbishop in the United States
Peter Henry Lemke, Roman Catholic missionary
Victoria Lipnic, Commissioner of the Equal Employment Opportunity Commission

References

External links
 Carrolltown official website

Populated places established in 1858
Boroughs in Cambria County, Pennsylvania
1858 establishments in Pennsylvania